Neutral ground may refer to:

 Median strip, in New Orleans area English
 Neutral Ground (Louisiana), a no man's land between Spanish Texas and American Louisiana in the early 19th century
 Neutral Zone (Westchester County), a 30-mile-wide stretch of land between the British troops occupying New York City during the American Revolution and American-held territory in northern Westchester County, New York

See also
 Neutral zone (disambiguation)